Breinholt is a surname. Notable people with the surname include:

 Floyd E. Breinholt (1915–1997), American educator and painter
 Jeffrey Breinholt (born 1963), American lawyer
 Peter Breinholt (born 1969), American musician